Type 36 may refer to:
Bugatti Type 36, a car produced by Bugatti
Peugeot Type 36, a car produced by Peugeot
Bristol Type 36 Puma Tourer, a British civil utility biplane
Type 36, a Chinese clone of the M3 submachine gun, manufactured in 1947